Harbor is the seventh studio album by American folk rock trio America, released by Warner Bros. Records in February 1977.  It was the last to feature Dan Peek, who embarked on a solo Christian career shortly after the album's release. The album was produced by longtime Beatles producer George Martin, the fifth of seven consecutive albums he produced with America.

Though a major commercial disappointment compared to America's six previous albums, the album did reach number 21 on the Billboard album chart. Three singles ("God of the Sun", "Don't Cry Baby" and the disco song "Slow Down") were released from the album but all failed to chart, although "God of the Sun" and "Now She's Gone" did receive some airplay.

Despite the serene tone of the title and artwork, Harbor is more brooding and pessimistic than most of America's previous albums.

Track listing

Side One

Side Two

Personnel
America
 Dewey Bunnell - lead and backing vocals, guitars
 Gerry Beckley - lead and backing vocals, guitars, pianos, synthesizers
 Dan Peek - lead and backing vocals, guitars, pianos, synthesizers
with:
 David Dickey - bass guitar
 Willie Leacox - drums, percussion
 Jim Calire - saxophone
 Tom Walsh - percussion
 Larry Carlton - electric sitar
Technical
 George Martin - producer
 Henry Diltz - photographer
 Philip Hartmann - cover design
 Vivien Bunnell, Lexie Hartmann and Jim Hoskins - additional poster photography

Charts

References

1977 albums
America (band) albums
Albums produced by George Martin
Warner Records albums